Gonten railway station is a railway station in the district of Gonten, in the Swiss canton of Appenzell Innerrhoden. It is located on the  Gossau–Wasserauen line of Appenzell Railways.

History 
The present square building was constructed between 2012 and 2016, replacing an older structure. The top floor contains doctors' offices.

Services 
 the following services stop at Gonten:

References

External links 
 
 

Railway stations in the canton of Appenzell Innerrhoden
Appenzell Railways stations